Anaxibia nigricauda is a species of spiders of the genus Anaxibia. It is endemic to Sri Lanka.

References

Spiders described in 1905
Dictynidae
Endemic fauna of Sri Lanka
Spiders of Asia